The Killing Doll is a novel by British writer Ruth Rendell, published in 1984.

References

1984 British novels
Novels by Ruth Rendell
Hutchinson (publisher) books